Leif Georg Folke "Totte" Bengtsson (born 24 April 1944) is a Swedish former ice hockey center and Olympian.

Bengtsson played with Team Sweden at the 1968 Winter Olympics held in Grenoble, France. He previously played for Leksands IF and Djurgårdens IF Hockey in the Swedish Elite League.

References

1944 births
Djurgårdens IF Hockey players
Ice hockey players at the 1968 Winter Olympics
Living people
Olympic ice hockey players of Sweden
Swedish ice hockey centres